The Emirates Palace Mandarin Oriental, Abu Dhabi (Arabic: قصر الإمارات) is a luxury five-star hotel in Abu Dhabi, United Arab Emirates. It has been operated by Mandarin Oriental as of 1 January 2020. The hotel project was launched in December 2001 and was initially operated by Kempinski from its opening in November 2005 until 1 January 2020.

Due to the change in management, the Palace was renovated over the course of two years.

Construction
The building was designed by WATG Architects with Reza Rahmanian as the Architect of the exterior. The design of the hotel is a mix of Islamic architectural elements such as balance, geometry, proportion, rhythm and hierarchical emphasis alongside modern methods of design and construction. The central dome features elaborate geometrical patterns and 114 smaller domes are spread over the building. The colour of the building was inspired by different shades of sand found in the Arabian Desert. Construction, carried out by Belgian company BESIX, started in December 2001. The interior fit-out works were delivered by Depa Interiors, Abu Dhabi with the hotel opening its gates in February 2005. The construction costs were around US$3 billion (11.02 billion dirhams) making it the third most expensive hotel ever built, surpassed by the Cosmopolitan of Las Vegas in Las Vegas ($3.9 billion) and the Marina Bay Sands in Singapore ($5.5 billion).

Rooms and facilities
Emirates Palace consists of 390 residences, including 92 suites and 22 residential suites. The residences are spread over two wings as well as a primary central building. The majority of the suites are furnished in gold and marble. The main primary building houses an expensive marble floor and a large patterned dome above, picked out in gold. The penthouse floor has six Rulers' Suites which are reserved exclusively for dignitaries, such as royalty.

The facilities include 2 spa facilities, over 40 meeting rooms, a 1.3 km long beach, a marina, 2 helicopter landing pads, a ballroom that accommodates up to 2500 people, various luxury shops and international restaurants.

Events
Christina Aguilera performed at the venue during her Back To Basics Tour on 24 October 2008. The show had an audience of 20,000 people, attracting great media attention to the hotel. The hotel also appears in the film Fast and Furious 7, which was released in 2015. Shots of the hotel were also used in the 2007 film The Kingdom.
Justin Timberlake has been at this location for a tour on 6 December 2007 for a concert.  The Emirates Palace also appears in the 2019 film 6 Underground along with other iconic sites around the city.

On 30 January 2011, English Rugby Union side London Wasps played their 2010–11 LV Cup round 3 matches against London rivals Harlequins in a purpose-built stadium in the palace grounds. This was the first English domestic match to take place abroad.

Image gallery

References

External links
 Hotel website
 New York Times article

Mandarin Oriental Hotel Group
Hotels in Abu Dhabi
Tourist attractions in Abu Dhabi
Hotel buildings completed in 2005